The Men's 4 × 100 metre medley relay event at the 2013 Southeast Asian Games took place on 16 December 2013 at Wunna Theikdi Aquatics Centre.

There were 6 teams who took part in this event. Indonesia  won the gold medal, Singapore and Thailand won the silver and bronze medal respectively. However, Indonesia was disqualified and promoting Singapore to the gold medal, Thailand to silver medal and Malaysia to bronze medal respectively.

Schedule
All times are Myanmar Standard Time (UTC+06:30)

Records

Results

References

External links

Swimming at the 2013 Southeast Asian Games